Semyon Egorovich Raich (Russian: Семён Егорович Раич) (1792–1855) was a Russian poet and translator, who worked as a teacher at the boarding house of Moscow University. He published such literary miscellanies as Northern lyre (Северная лира), Galateya (Галатея) and others. He was a tutor of the great Russian poet Fyodor Ivanovich Tyutchev.

References

Poets from the Russian Empire
Male writers from the Russian Empire
Russian male poets
Translators from the Russian Empire
1792 births
1855 deaths
19th-century poets
19th-century translators from the Russian Empire
19th-century male writers from the Russian Empire
Russian Latinists